The Kildare Under 21 Football Championship is an annual Gaelic football competition contested by the Kildare GAA clubs. This is a knockout competition restricted to players who are under the age of 21 on 1 January of the competition year.

Finals listed by year

References

External links
 Kildare GAA
 Kildare - HoganStand

Gaelic football competitions in County Kildare